Meat Mountain (elevation ) is a summit in North Slope Borough, Alaska, in the United States.

Meat Mountain is an English translation of the Eskimo name Nikipak.

References

Mountains of Alaska
Mountains of North Slope Borough, Alaska